Leucoptera genistae is a moth in the family Lyonetiidae. It is found in France, Italy, Austria, Hungary and Bulgaria.

The larvae feed on Genista anglica and Genista germanica. They mine the leaves of their host plant. The mines are undistinguishable from those of Leucoptera laburnella The mine starts as a densely contorted corridor, that quickly turns brown. It is followed by a more or less straight corridor entirely filled with greyish-green frass. Then it widens into a round blotch that overruns the earlier corridor and in the end may occupy half of a leaflet. Pupation takes place outside of the mine.

References

Leucoptera (moth)
Moths described in 1933
Moths of Europe